This is a list of medalists at the 2004 Summer Olympics, which were held in Athens, Greece.
{| id="toc" class="toc" summary="Contents"
|align="center" colspan=3|Contents
|-
|
Archery
Athletics
Badminton
Baseball
Basketball
Boxing
Canoeing
Cycling
Diving
Equestrian
Fencing
|valign=top|
Field hockey
Football
Gymnastics
Handball
Judo
Modern pentathlon
Rowing
Sailing
Shooting
Softball
|valign=top|
Swimming
Synchronized swimming
Table tennis
Taekwondo
Tennis
Triathlon
Volleyball
Water polo
Weightlifting
Wrestling
|-
|align=center colspan=3| Leading medal winners       Notes       References       Bibliography
|}


Archery

Athletics

Track

Men’s events

Women’s events

Road

Field

Men’s events

Women’s events 

* Athletes who participated in the heats only and received medals.

Badminton

Baseball

Basketball

Boxing

Canoeing

Slalom

Sprint

Men’s events

Women’s events

Cycling

Road

Track

Men’s events

Women’s events

Mountain bike

Diving

Men’s events

Women’s events

Equestrian

Fencing

Men’s events

Women’s events

Field hockey

Football

Gymnastics

Artistic

Men’s events

Women’s events

Rhythmic

Trampoline

Handball

Judo

Men’s events

Women’s events

Modern pentathlon

Rowing

Men’s events

Women’s events

Sailing

Shooting

Men’s events

Women’s events

Softball

Swimming

Men’s events

Women’s events 

* Swimmers who participated in the heats only and received medals.

Synchronised swimming

Table tennis

Taekwondo

Tennis

Triathlon

Volleyball

Beach

Indoor

Water polo

Weightlifting

Men’s events

Women’s events

Wrestling

Freestyle

Men’s

Women’s events

Greco-Roman

Leading medal winners
27 competitors won at least three medals.

Notes

See also
 2004 Summer Olympics medal table

References

External links

Bibliography 

 

 

 

 

Medalists
Lists of Summer Olympic medalists by year
Medalists at the 2004 Summer Olympics